MusicNT is a non-profit organisation devoted to developing, representing and servicing original music in the Northern Territory of Australia.  The organisation, formed in 1996, serves a support network for musicians in the Northern Territory who are often disadvantaged by social conditions and by living in remote areas  It has offices located in Darwin and Alice Springs.

Initiatives 
Some of MusicNT's initiatives include:
 National Indigenous Music Awards
 Bush Bands Bash
 Plus1 Initiative
 intune darwin (annual music conference)
 MiNT Radio
 Hot Shots Music Photography exhibition

References

Darwin, Northern Territory
Music organisations based in Australia
Non-profit organisations based in the Northern Territory